The Flicks Community Movie Theater, was the first independent movie house in Phnom Penh, Cambodia. Its venue offered big screen movies in an air conditioned movie room to the expatriate community.

The Flicks is a member of the Motion Picture Association of Cambodia (MPAC) and registers all of its screening titles with the Cambodian Department of Cinema & Cultural Diffusion, making it the only movie theater in Cambodia to do so.

History 

Martin and Jeanette Robinson founded The Flicks Festival Movie House in 2009. They renovated a pre-Khmer Rouge villa into one with an air conditioned movie room with a bar. In March 2011 Dutch serial entrepreneur Ramon Stoppelenburg took over the business, after an online fund-raising to save the movie theater. The flicks closed down on 8 August 2021. According to Stoppelenburg, it was due to the impact that Covid-19 had on the industry, particularly on independent film venues.

The Flicks 2 
Demand rose for a second location in the city center. A brand new movie venue was constructed on #89, Street 136, inside the 11 Happy Backpackers Hotel. The Killing Fields (film) screens daily. The Flicks 2 could seat 20 people and closed in December 2017.

The Flicks 3 
The Flicks 3 on #8, Street 258, between Wat Botum Park and the Hotel Cambodiana, opened its doors in August 2014 and was the first venue to also be a restaurant, cocktail bar and guesthouse. The Flicks 3 could seat 30 people. The Flicks 3 closed in December 2017.

References

External links
 The Flicks Community Movie Theaters The Flicks website
 7 Questions to Flicks owner Ramon Stoppelenburg (Phnom Penh Post)
 A Cinematic Tour of Theatres in Phnom Penh (Phnom Penh Post)
 A decade of Phnom Penh’s first Independent Theatre A decade of Phnom Penh’s first Independent Theatre (the Khmer Times)

Cinema of Cambodia
Event venues established in 2009
Buildings and structures in Phnom Penh